Sports climbing competition at the 2014 Asian Beach Games was held in Phuket, Thailand from 15 to 16 November 2014 at Saphan Hin Sports Center, Phuket.

Medalists

Men

Women

Medal table

Results

Men

Speed
15 November

Qualifying

Knockout round

Speed relay
16 November

Qualifying

Knockout round

Women

Speed
15 November

Qualifying

Knockout round

Speed relay
16 November

Qualifying

Knockout round

References

External links 
 

2014 Asian Beach Games events
Sport climbing at the Asian Beach Games
2014 in sport climbing